Richard Nowakowski (born 27 September 1955 in Sztum, Poland) is a retired boxer from East Germany, who won the silver medal in the men's featherweight division (– 57 kg) at the 1976 Summer Olympics in Montreal, Quebec, Canada. There he was defeated in the final by Ángel Herrera of Cuba.

Four years later, when Moscow hosted the Summer Games, Nowakowski competed in the lightweight category (– 60 kg), and captured a bronze medal. This was the same result he attained in 1982 at the World Championships in Munich, West Germany.

Olympic results 
1976 – Montreal

 Round of 64: bye
 Round of 32: Defeated Ruben Mares (Philippines) by decision, 5–0
 Round of 16: Defeated Behzad Ghaedi Bardeh (Iran) referee stopped contest in third round
 Quarterfinal: Defeated Gheorghe Ciochina (Romania) referee stopped contest in third round
 Semifinal: Defeated Leszek Kosedowski (Poland) by decision, 5–0
 Final: Lost to Ángel Herrera (Cuba) second-round knockout (was awarded silver medal)

1980 – Moscow
 Round of 32: Defeated Christopher Ossai (Nigeria) by decision, 5–0
 Round of 16: Defeated Geofrey Nyeko (Uganda) referee stopped contest in the first round
 Quarterfinal: Defeated George Gilbody (Great Britain) by decision, 5–0
 Semifinal: Lost to Viktor Demyanenko (Soviet Union) referee stopped contest in the first round (was awarded bronze medal)

References
  databaseOlympics
  Profile on SVZ online
  sports-reference

1955 births
Living people
People from Sztum
German male boxers
Sportspeople from Pomeranian Voivodeship
Featherweight boxers
Lightweight boxers
Olympic boxers of East Germany
Boxers at the 1976 Summer Olympics
Boxers at the 1980 Summer Olympics
Olympic silver medalists for East Germany
Olympic bronze medalists for East Germany
Polish emigrants to East Germany
Olympic medalists in boxing
Medalists at the 1976 Summer Olympics
Medalists at the 1980 Summer Olympics
AIBA World Boxing Championships medalists
Recipients of the Patriotic Order of Merit in bronze